Interstate 376 Business (I-376 Bus.), commonly referred to as Business Loop 376 or simply Business 376, is a  business loop of I-376 in Allegheny County, Pennsylvania. It is located almost entirely within Moon Township and serves both the township and the cargo and services areas of Pittsburgh International Airport. The road is a part of the Beaver Valley Expressway from its western terminus to University Boulevard and part of the Airport Parkway from University Boulevard to its eastern terminus. It is officially known as the 99th Infantry Division Memorial Highway for its entire length. Though mostly a freeway, a short section in the middle of the route has at-grade signalized intersections.

It is one of only two business loops of an Interstate Highway in the Commonwealth of Pennsylvania, the other being I-83 Bus. Originally, the route was a part of Pennsylvania Route 60 (PA 60) before becoming Pennsylvania Route 60 Business (PA 60 Bus.)  in 1992. In 2009, PA 60 was truncated to its current northern terminus as I-376 was extended in its place to Hermitage, causing the route to be redesignated as I-376 Bus.

Route description

Business Loop 376 diverges from I-376 at a partial interchange in Findlay Township, heading due south as a continuation of the Beaver Valley Expressway with a wide grass median. The road immediately turns east, meeting Flaugherty Run Road at a diamond interchange which allows indirect access to the remaining movements for I-376. Heading east, Business Loop 376 comes to a diamond interchange with International Drive, which provides access to three of the cargo areas of Pittsburgh International Airport. Further east, the median narrows and the road curves southeast before coming to a signalized intersection with Hangar Road, which connects to the airport service area, marking the end of the Beaver Valley Expressway.

Business Loop 376 turns east again as a four-lane, at-grade limited-access road before intersecting University Boulevard to the north and Horizon Drive to the south. This intersection is the beginning of the Airport Parkway, at which point a wide grass median begins again. The third and final signalized intersection on the route is with Airside Drive, leading to more of the airport's cargo areas. The median narrows again as Business Loop 376 curves south-southeast as a freeway once again. The road intersects Thorn Run Road and then Ewing Road before ending at I-376. The Airport Parkway name continues onto I-376 to the east.

History
The Airport Parkway section of the route was built in the early 1950s as a four-lane, at-grade limited-access road connecting what was then Beers School Road (today University Boulevard) at the former Pittsburgh International Airport terminals to McClaren Road at the site of the current eastern terminus of the route. In 1962, the road became part of an extended PA 60, which continued north along what is now University Boulevard to PA 51.

Construction began in the late 1960s on the Beaver Valley Expressway section of the road, which opened by 1971. At the time, the freeway abruptly ended at a stub just east of the current International Drive interchange. Traffic was diverted off the mainline onto a temporary connector road which fed into the current at-grade four-lane divided portion of the route. Original plans called for the Beaver Valley Expressway to be extended east to directly connect to the freeway portion of the Airport Parkway. This plan was cancelled in the 1970s, causing a short gap in the freeway portion of PA 60.

In 1992, the Southern Expressway opened, connecting to the new Pittsburgh International Airport terminal. The PA 60 designation was rerouted onto it, creating PA 60 Bus. in its place.

In order to increase the accessibility of the cargo areas, International Drive was built, and with it came a new interchange. The project also involved reconstructing the road to the east of the interchange, removing the stub of the cancelled Beaver Valley Expressway extension and improving the transition from freeway to limited-access highway. Construction began in 2001 and finished in 2003.

I-376 was extended to I-80 near Hermitage in 2009, and PA 60 was cut back to its current northern terminus. As a result, PA 60 Bus. was decommissioned and replaced with Business Loop 376.

Major intersections

See also

References

External links

 Pennsylvania Highways: I-376 Business Routes
 Business Loop I-376 at AARoads.com

76-3
76-3 (Business)
Transportation in Allegheny County, Pennsylvania
3 Business